Parastratiosphecomyia stratiosphecomyioides is a species of fly in the family Stratiomyidae. It is native to Thailand.   Its genus name comes from Ancient Greek, meaning "Near soldier wasp-fly", with its species name meaning "wasp fly-like". It is considered to be the animal with the longest valid scientific name; the name Gammaracanthuskytodermogammarus loricatobaicalensis was longer, but was suppressed and is no longer valid. The proposed name for the bacterium Myxococcus  is longer, but it is not an animal, and under the rules of nomenclature for bacteria, the name still must be published in the International Journal of Systematic and Evolutionary Microbiology (IJSEM) before it is accepted as valid. P. stratiosphecomyioides, sometimes referred to as the Southeast Asian soldier fly, was described in 1923 by British entomologist Enrico Brunetti. This insect is usually between 10.3 and 10.4 mm.

Markings and coloration
Given its wasp-like appearance, P. stratiosphecomyioides might exhibit Batesian mimicry, which could reduce its frequency of being eaten by predators.

See also
 List of long species names

References

External links
 
 

Stratiomyidae
Insects described in 1923
Taxa named by Enrico Adelelmo Brunetti